Izoro is an unincorporated community in Lampasas County, in the U.S. state of Texas. According to the Handbook of Texas, the community had a population of 17 in 2000. It is located within the Killeen-Temple-Fort Hood metropolitan area.

History
Izoro was founded in the early 1880s and early settler John Higgins named it Higgins Gap. Violence plagued the community in its early years, suffering from feuds between settlers and Indian raids. In 1885, both C.J. Dumas built a cotton gin and E.J. Healer built a general store in Izoro. A post office was established at Izoro in 1888 with Thomas J. Upton as the first postmaster, but it was located in nearby Coryell County. A well-known resident gave it the name Izoro for his daughter, Izoro Gilliam. The post office then moved to Lampasas County in 1914 and grew to have telephone service, two churches, and three stores. The population of the community was reported as 25 in 1925, 150 in 1927, 25 in 1933, 75 in 1949, and 31 from 1968 to 1990. There was only one gas station and a combination post office/community center in the mid-1980s. The population was reported as 17 in 2000. Today, the community serves as a vacation spot for tourists, hunters, and fishermen.

In the early 1900s, a couple whose families did not want them to marry each other got into a feud at a local church. The woman's father and husband died during a gunfight, while other family members were injured.

The community grew up on a stagecoach trail from Pearl to Townsen Mills. The boll weevil devastated crops in the area in the 1930s. Ethel Upton also served as a postmistress for a time. A dentist also served in the community.

Geography

Education
Izoro had its own school in 1914. Today, the community is served by the Lampasas Independent School District, with elementary-age kids going to Hanna Springs Elementary School.

References

Unincorporated communities in Lampasas County, Texas
Unincorporated communities in Texas